Beyond the Wall is a 2022 Iranian drama film written and directed by Vahid Jalilvand, and produced by Ali Jalilvand. The film stars Navid Mohammadzadeh, Diana Habibi and Amir Aghaei. Beyond the Wall had its world premiere at the 79th Venice International Film Festival on 8 September 2022.

Premise 
A blind man named Ali attempts suicide, but is interrupted by his building concierge; he then tells Ali about an escaped woman, named Leila, who is hidden in the building. Ali becomes determined to help Leila.

Cast 
 Navid Mohammadzadeh as Ali
 Diana Habibi as Leila
 Amir Aghaei
 
 
 Danial Kheirikhah

Production 

The film is written and directed by Vahid Jalilvand, and produced by his brother Ali Jalilvand, starring Navid Mohammadzadeh and Amir Aghaei, who have worked together with Jalilvand in his previous film No Date, No Signature.

The film is said to have taken at least two years to make, and filming was halted after Mohammadzadeh, the lead actor, contracted COVID-19.

Release 
Beyond the Wall had its world premiere in-competition at the 79th Venice International Film Festival for the Golden Lion, on 8 September 2022.

Similar to Leila's Brothers by Saeed Roustayi at the 2022 Cannes Film Festival starring Navid Mohammadzadeh, Beyond The Wall has not received permission from the Iranian authorities. German company, The Match Factory, secured the film's international rights in July 2022.

Reception

Accolades 
Beyond the Wall was selected to compete for Golden Lion at the 79th Venice International Film Festival, along with No Bears by Jafar Panahi as Iran's only entries for the main competition.

References

External links 
 
2022 drama films
Iranian drama films
2022 films
2020s Persian-language films